Rectangle is a French independent record label established in Paris by Quentin Rollet and Noël Akchoté in 1994. It started specializing in vinyl releases, and moved to CD at the end of the 90's. After a long break it relaunched on MP3 format in 2011.

The label covers a vast range of styles such as jazz, free jazz, improvisation, chanson, electronica, post-rock, and spoken word.

Among the artists published are Derek Bailey, David Grubbs, Fred Frith, Eugene Chadbourne, Taku Sugimoto, Noël Akchoté; turntablists eRikm, Otomo Yoshihide, Martin Tétreault; saxophonists Lol Coxhill, Daunik Lazro, Quentin Rollet, the organ player Charlie O., the performer Jean-Louis Costes, singers such as Red, Philippe Katerine, Sasha Andres, Phil Minton, Fred Poulet, Justus Köhncke; the filmmakers John B. Root, Jean-Marie Straub and Danièle Huillet, the bassist Joëlle Léandre, as well as the sound and sampling artists Xavier Garcia, Andrew Sharpley, SebastiAn, the actresses Irène Jacob, Anna Karina, or visual artists such as Pakito Bolino, Hendrik Hegray, Albert Oehlen and Stephen Prina.

Selected discography

Vinyl releases
Rec-AA - David Grubbs, The Coxcomb / Aux Noctambules (12") Rectangle 1999
Rec-AB- Various, Orléans Orléans, (Tribute to Albert Ayler, 10") Rectangle 1999
Rec-BA - Derek Bailey & Ben Watson, 1/28 Silverfish Macronix (7") Rectangle 1993
Rec-E - Eugene Chadbourne, The Acquaduct (LP) Rectangle 1996
Rec-ESH123 - Jean-Marie Straub & Danièle Huillet with Thierry Jousse, Entretiens (3 x LP) Rectangle 1998
Rec-F - Derek Bailey & Noël Akchoté, Close To The Kitchen (LP) Rectangle 1996
Rec-G- Jean-Louis Costes, Vivre Encore (7")Rectangle 1996
Rec-H - Noël Akchoté, Picture(s) (LP, S/Sided) Rectangle 1995
Rec-K - Fred Frith & Noël Akchoté, Réel (10") Rectangle 1996
REC L - Derek Bailey & Eugene Chadbourne, Tout For Tea! (10") Rectangle 1995
Rec-M - Workshop De Lyon, Fondus (LP) Rectangle 1997
Rec-N - Lol Coxhill, Phil Minton & Noël Akchoté, Xmas Songs (7") Rectangle 1998
Rec-PD - Charlie O., Proud To Be There (7") Rectangle 1997
Rec-PS- Jean-François Pauvros, ...Mon Homme (7") Rectangle 1999
Rec-Q1 - Quentin Rollet, Aka Doug (7") Rectangle 1994
Rec-RREM - eRikm, Re/Cycling Rectangle (7") Rectangle 1999
Rec-RRXG2- Xavier Garcia, Re/Cycling Rectangle (7") Rectangle 1999
Rec-RRYO - Otomo Yoshihide, Re/cycling Rectangle (7") Rectangle 2000
Rec-U - Eugene Chadbourne, To Doug (7") Rectangle 2000

CD
Rec-AC2 - David Grubbs, Thirty Minute Raven (CD, Digipack) Rectangle 2001
Rec-AL2 - Noël Akchoté, Perpetual Joseph (CD) Rectangle2002
Rec-AM2 - Noël Akchoté, Simple Joseph (CD) Rectangle2001
Rec-AN - Noël Akchoté, Alike Joseph (CD) Rectangle2000
Rec-BB2 - Red, Felk (CD) Rectangle 2000
Rec-BC2 - Red, Songs From A Room (CD ) Rectangle 2001
Rec-BO4 - Katerine, with Margot Abascal, Anna Karina, etc., Nom De Code: Sacha (CD) Rectangle 2002
Rec-CC2VOL1 - Lee Scratch Perry, The Compiler Vol. 1 (CD) Rectangle 2001
Rec-E2 - Eugene Chadbourne, The Acquaduct (CD) Rectangle 1996
Rec-ESH45 - Jean-Marie Straub & Danièle Huillet with Thierry Jousse, Entretiens (2 x CD) Rectangle 1999
Rec-ELLE2 - Joëlle Léandre, Dire Du Dire (entretiens, CD) Rectangle 2000
Rec-MCA - Phil Minton, Lol Coxhill et Noël Akchoté, My Chelsea (CD)Rectangle 1997
REC-S2- Derek Bailey, Pat Thomas & Steve Noble, And (CD), Rectangle 1999
Rec-UEE1 - Quentin Rollet, eRikm, Akosh Szelevényi et Charlie O., MOSQ (CD) Rectangle 2001
Rec-V2 - Jean-Louis Costes, Nik Ta Race (CD) Rectangle 2000

MP3 
Rec-AO2 - Noël Akchoté, Alive Joseph (MP3, Mini-Album) Rectangle 2011
Rec-AP2 - Noël Akchoté, Solo Live in NYC (1998) (MP3, EP) Rectangle 2011
Rec-BO5 - John B. Root & Noël Akchoté, with Fred Poulet, Ally Mac Tyana, Elixir & French Beauty (MP3) Rectangle 2011
Rec-CAS2 - Tom Cora, Noël Akchoté & Alfred Spirli, Paris 1997 (Live In) (MP3) Rectangle 2011
Rec-DB201 - Derek Bailey, This Guitar (MP3) Rectangle 2011
Rec-DB202- Derek Bailey, Words (MP3) Rectangle 2011
Rec-NYC12- Quentin Rollet & Noël Akchoté, NYC 1+2 (MP3, AudioFilm) Rectangle 2011
Rec-RRAS - Andrew Sharpley, Re/Cycling Rectangle (MP3, Single) Rectangle 2011
Rec-RRMT - Martin Tétreault, Re/Cycling Rectangle (MP3, Single) Rectangle 2011
Rec-V2S - Jean-Louis Costes & SebastiAn, Seule La Musique (MP3, Single) Rectangle 2011
Rec-Y - Otomo Yoshihide & Taku Sugimoto, Untitled 1-4 (MP3, EP) Rectangle 2011

References

French independent record labels
Jazz record labels